is a Hebrew Bible character. He was a son of Enan and chosen to be chief of the tribe of Naphtali, one of the leaders of the tribes of Israel during The Exodus.

Book of Numbers people